John Wilson FitzPatrick, 1st Baron Castletown PC (23 September 1811 – 22 January 1883), known as John Wilson until 1842, was an Irish Liberal politician.

Castletown was the illegitimate son of John FitzPatrick, 2nd Earl of Upper Ossory, and was baptised John Wilson. He was educated at Eton. He inherited parts of his father's estates in Ireland and in 1842 he assumed by Royal licence the surname of FitzPatrick.

He was appointed High Sheriff of Queen's County in 1836. He was then elected to the House of Commons for Queen's County in 1837, a seat he represented until 1841, and again from 1847 to 1852 and from 1865 to 1869. He was admitted to the Irish Privy Council in 1848 and in 1869 he was raised to the peerage as Baron Castletown, of Upper Ossory in the Queen's County. Apart from his parliamentary career he was also Lord Lieutenant of Queen's County from 1855 to 1883.

Lord Castletown married Augusta Mary, daughter of Reverend Archibald Douglas, in 1830. They had one son and six daughters. He died in 1883, aged 71, and was succeeded in the barony by his only son Bernard. Lady Castletown died in 1899.

References

www.thepeerage.com

External links
The Fitzpatrick – Mac Giolla Phádraig Clan Society
 
National Archives items relating to John Wilson Fitzpatrick

1811 births
1883 deaths
19th-century Irish politicians
1
Lord-Lieutenants of Queen's County
Members of the Privy Council of Ireland
FitzPatrick, John
People educated at Eton College
Wilson, John
FitzPatrick, John
FitzPatrick, John
FitzPatrick, John
UK MPs who were granted peerages
John
High Sheriffs of Queen's County
Politicians from County Laois
Peers of the United Kingdom created by Queen Victoria